The Austrian Regionalliga ( or plural , means Regional League) is the third-highest division in Austrian football, after the Austrian Bundesliga and the Second League. It is divided into 5 groups: East, covering the states of Vienna, Lower Austria and Burgenland; Central, covering the states of Styria, Carinthia, Upper Austria and the exclave of East Tyrol; Regionalliga Salzburg, covering the state of Salzburg; Regionalliga Tirol, covering the state of Tyrol (with the exception of East Tyrol) and the Eliteliga Vorarlberg, covering the state of Vorarlberg.

History

Tauernliga and Arlbergliga 
With introduction of the Staatsliga A as the first division and the Staatsliga B as the second division of Austrian football in the 1949–50 season, also the teams from the Austrian states were allowed to play for the first time again in the highest leagues since the end of the second world war. This entailed also a change of the categorization in the amateur football. While Central and Eastern Austrian football teams played in the respective national leagues, from which the champions got promoted either directly or by play-offs (Relegationsspiele) to the Staatsliga B, the Western states did not participate in the Staatsliga B.

In 1949–50 the teams from Carinthia state and Salzburg already played in the again-created Tauernliga and from 1955–56 to 1958–59 season in the Tauernliga South (Carinthia) and Tauernliga North (Salzburg). Besides the Arlbergliga consisted from 1950–51 to 1959–60 the clubs from Tyrol state and Vorarlberg state. These leagues can be regarded as second divisions (apart from the Staatsliga B) since their champions played in direct duels for promotion to the Staatsliga A.

Champions

 In 1960, the Carinthian teams already played in the Central Regionalliga and the Tyrolean and Vorarlberg clubs were still in the Arlbergliga. For this reason the champion of the Salzburger Landesliga  was entitled to deny the qualification matches against the champion of the Arlbergliga.

The Regionalliga and the Alpenliga

In the season of 1959–60, the Eastern and Central Regionalligen were established and one year later the Western Regionalliga. The Regionalligen counted up to the season of 1973–74 as football's second division in Austria. The respective champions were allowed to get promoted directly to the top level. In 1974–75 the introduction of the first and second Austrian Bundesliga happened, with in each case 10 clubs and to the abolish of the Western and Central Regionalligen. For the promotion to the 2nd Bundesliga, the champion of the Eastern Regionalliga, which was allowed to move upwards directly, and which the champions of the State Leagues of Salzburg, Tyrol, Vorarlberg, Carinthia, Upper Austria and Styria those Play Offs had to complete in each case. In the 1977–78 season, the states of  Salzburg, Tirol and Vorarlberg merged their Landesligen to Alpenliga as the 3rd division. In the 1980–81 season, the Western Regionalliga was once again introduced as the third division. The Eastern Regionalliga championship was not held from 1980–81 to 1983–84 and it would not be until the 1984–85 season that it would be reintroduced. Up until the 1995–96 season, the champions of the Western and Eastern Regionalligen earned a direct promotion to the 2nd Bundesliga. The Central Regionalliga, however, would not be reintroduced until the 1994–95 season. The champions of the regional organizations, the state football associations of Upper Austria, Carinthia (with East Tyrol) and Styria had their only promotional spot to the 2nd division decided in play off matches.

Between the 1996–97 and 2003–04 seasons, the three champions of the Regionalligen together with the last one of the First Division (since the renaming of the First Division as Erste Liga the second highest division in Austria) played those Play Off matches to accomplish the two remaining promotional/relegation spots. After an expansion of the First Division to twelve clubs it was decided that - from the 2005–06 season - due to deprivation of pro league licenses (at the time there were 10 slots), the winners of the regional leagues went up directly again. The First Division contracted back to ten teams in 2009–10, thus the number of promotions to and relegations from the second tier were reduced to two. Until 2013–14 one conference winner played the bottom First Division team, while the other conference winners contested the other promotion spot.

Until 2014–15 two teams are relegated from and promoted to the First Division. In 2014–15 the Western champions were directly promoted while those from the East and Central contested the other promotion place. In 2015–16 all three division winners were promoted to fill vacancies in the second tier and 2016–17 only the Central winners were promoted as the Eastern and Western champions declined promotion. At the end of 2017–18 all three Regionalliga champions and six other licensed teams went up when the second division, now the Second League, expanded from 10 to 16 clubs.

Champions (1960–2019)

References

External links

 
3
Third level football leagues in Europe
1959 establishments in Austria